Miles Lyons (born October 8, 2002) is an American professional soccer player who plays as a defender for USL Championship club El Paso Locomotive.

Club career

Youth
Lyons, born in Tucson, Arizona, began playing with the Barça Residency Academy in 2018 after previously playing with local Tucson teams and ODP programs. In 2021, he spent time with USL League One side FC Tucson. In 2022, Lyons committed to playing college soccer at the University of Portland before switching to California State University, Fullerton.

El Paso Locomotive
On July 14, 2022, Lyons opted to not play college soccer, instead signing a professional contract with USL Championship side El Paso Locomotive. He made his professional debut on July 18, 2022, appearing as an 84th–minute substitute during a 4–0 loss to Oakland Roots.

References

External links

2002 births
Living people
American soccer players
Association football defenders
El Paso Locomotive FC players
Soccer players from Arizona
Sportspeople from Tucson, Arizona
USL Championship players